Jens Kielland is the name of:

Jens Zetlitz Kielland (1816–1881), consul and artist
Jens Zetlitz Monrad Kielland (1866–1926), architect, grandson of Jens Zetlitz Kielland